Staib may refer to:

People
 Christian Staib (1892–1956), Norwegian Olympic sailor
 Constantin Staib (born 1995), German field hockey player
 David Paul Staib, Jr., American NASA Astronaut
 Elizabeth Staib, Miss Alaska USA, 1976
 Margaret Staib (born 1962), former CEO of Airservices Australia and a former senior officer in the Royal Australian Air Force.
 Walter Staib, German-American chef, proprietor of City Tavern, and host of A Taste of History on PBS
 Wilbur Staib (1914-1993), self-taught designer of a series of small aircraft including the Staib LB-1, Staib LB-2, Staib LB-4 and the Staib Helicopter.